Spilosoma ningyuenfui is a moth in the family Erebidae. It was described by Franz Daniel in 1943. It is found in China (Yunnan, Sichuan, Tibet).

Subspecies
Spilosoma ningyuenfui ningyuenfui (China: Yunnan)
Spilosoma ningyuenfui flava Daniel, 1943 (China: Sichuan, Tibet)

References

External links
Spilosoma ningyuenfui at EOL
Spilosoma ninyuenfui flava at BHL

Moths described in 1943
ningyuenfui